Leon Stanisław Niemczyk (15 December 1923 – 29 November 2006) was a Polish actor.

Niemczyk developed into a leading box-office star throughout the 1960s, known for serious dramas, including historical dramas and war films. He appeared in over 500 films and television shows over the course of his career. His most memorable roles were Fulko de Lorche in Aleksander Ford's The Teutonic Knights, Andrzej in Roman Polanski's Knife in the Water and Jerzy in Jerzy Kawalerowicz's Night Train.

Niemczyk became an international star through positive reception for his leading role in Knife in the Water (1962), earning Polish cinema's first nomination for the Academy Award for Best Foreign Film.

During World War II, he served under Gen. George S. Patton in the U.S. 3rd Army. He died of cancer.

Selected filmography 
 Inland Empire (2006)
 Boys Don't Cry (Chłopaki nie płaczą, 2000)
 A Trap (1997)
 Conversation with a Cupboard Man (1993)
 The Last Ferry (1989)
 Republika nadziei (1988)
 O-Bi, O-Ba: The End of Civilization (O-bi, o-ba: Koniec cywilizacji, 1985)
 Woman Doctors (1984)
 Die schwarze Mühle (1975, vocal cords by Norbert Christian)
 The Deluge (Potop, 1975)
 Remember Your Name  (Zapamiętaj imię swoje, 1974) 
 Tecumseh (1972)
 KLK Calling PTZ - The Red Orchestra (1971)
 Znaki na drodze (1970)
 Frozen Flashes (1967)
 Katastrofa (1965)
 The Saragossa Manuscript (Rękopis znaleziony w Saragossie, 1965)
 Knife in the Water (Nóż w wodzie, 1962)
 Na białym szlaku (1962)
 Mandrin (1962)
 The Teutonic Knights (Krzyżacy, 1960)
 Night Train (Pociąg, 1959)
 The Eighth Day of the Week (Ósmy dzień tygodnia, 1958)
 Heroism (Eroica, 1958)
 Man on the Tracks (Człowiek na torze, 1957)
 Nikodem Dyzma (1956)
 Sprawa pilota Maresza (1956)

TV series
 Ranczo (2006–2007) - Japycz

References

External links
 

1923 births
2006 deaths
Male actors from Warsaw
Polish male film actors
Polish male television actors
Polish male stage actors
20th-century Polish male actors
21st-century Polish male actors
Commanders of the Order of Polonia Restituta
Recipients of the National Prize of East Germany
Deaths from lung cancer
Deaths from cancer in Poland